West Dean may refer to several places in England:

West Dean, Gloucestershire
West Dean, West Sussex
West Dean, Wiltshire
Westdean, East Sussex